George Marks (born November 10, 1999) is an American soccer player who plays as a goalkeeper for Major League Soccer club Charlotte FC.

Career

Youth
Marks joined the North Carolina FC academy in 2015, where he played until 2018. He was named as an amateur player with the team during their 2017 season in the NASL, and On December 14, 2017, it was announced Marks had signed a USL academy contract for the 2018 season with the first team in the United Soccer League, allowing Marks to retain his NCAA eligibility.

College 
In 2018, Marks attended Clemson University to play college soccer. In four seasons with the Tigers, Marks made 69 appearances, placing him as 3rd in Clemson history for goalkeeper wins (47), 7th in best goals allowed average (0.90 per game) and tied 3rd in most solo shutouts and most minutes. In 2019, he was named All-ACC Academic Team, Second-team All-South Region, Second-team All-ACC, and CoSIDA Academic All-District. 2020 saw Marks earn Third-team All-ACC honors, All-ACC Academic Team and CoSIDA Academic All-District, and in 2021, Second-team All-ACC, All-ACC Academic Team, CoSIDA Academic All District and Third-team All-South Region.
In 2021 Marks also captained the Clemson National Championship team and was named Most Outstanding Defensive Player for the NCAA tournament.

Amateur 
While at college, Marks had two spells with North Carolina FC U23 in the USL League Two. In 2018, he made seven appearances and in 2021 made four appearances.

Professional
On January 11, 2022, Marks was selected 57th overall in the 2022 MLS SuperDraft by Charlotte FC. Marks officially signed with the Major League Soccer side on February 22, 2022. He made his professional debut on April 20, 2022, starting in a 2–1 win after extra-time in a Lamar Hunt U.S. Open Cup fixture against Greenville Triumph SC.

References

1999 births
Living people
American soccer players
Association football goalkeepers
Charlotte FC draft picks
Charlotte FC players
Clemson Tigers men's soccer players
NCAA Division I Men's Soccer Tournament Most Outstanding Player winners
North Carolina FC players
North Carolina FC U23 players
Soccer players from Raleigh, North Carolina
Soccer players from Louisiana
Soccer players from North Carolina
USL League Two players
Major League Soccer players